Procyanidin B1 is a procyanidin dimer.

It is a molecule with a 4→8 bond (epicatechin-(4β→8)-catechin). Proanthocyanidin-B1 can be found in Cinnamomum verum (Ceylon cinnamon, in the rind, bark or cortex), in Uncaria guianensis (cat's claw, in the root), and in Vitis vinifera (common grape vine, in the leaf) or in peach.

Procyanidin B1 can be converted into procyanidin A1 by radical oxidation using 1,1-diphenyl-2-picrylhydrazyl (DPPH) radicals under neutral conditions.

See also 
 Phenolic content in wine

References 

Procyanidin dimers